The Ransohoff family is a German Jewish family originally from Westphalia, Germany. The progenitor of the family, Levy Abraham Ransohoff (1761-1845) was a wealthy Westphalian merchant, who had four sons. Each of his sons occupied key positions in the Frankfurt Parliament, became notable doctors and academics, and his eldest son, Sigmund even received a knighthood. In the beginning of the 20th-century, the majority of the family immigrated to Cincinnati, United States, where they rose to prominence in medicine and the arts.

See also
25469 Ransohoff, a planet named for the family.
Ben Casey, an American medical drama series partially inspired by the life of Joseph Ransohoff
Priscilla Ransohoff, Army educational specialist at Fort Monmouth (and wife of Nicholas Ransohoff, an orthopedic surgeon)

References 
Jewish surnames
Russian noble families

Jewish families
Jewish-German families